Marina Medvetskaya is a Georgian prima ballerina. She danced with the
Tbilsi State Academic Opera and Ballet Theatre, in Tbilsi, Georgia.
She was a student of the legendary ballet dancer Vakhtang Chabukiani.

She is currently the artistic director of
the St. Petersburg Classic Ballet Theatre

Career
Medvetskaya is the artistic director of the St. Petersburg Classic Ballet Theatre in St. Petersburg, Russia
Her company has performed in the Soviet Union, Europe, and over 50 countries.

The company was awarded the Gold Medal in the "Amber Necklace" International Ballet competition in Kaliningrad, Russia.

References

Ballet choreographers
Artistic directors
Soviet ballerinas
Living people
Ballerinas from Georgia (country)
Year of birth missing (living people)